The 1994 Vanderbilt Commodores football team represented Vanderbilt University in the 1994 NCAA Division I-A football season as a member of the Eastern Division of the Southeastern Conference (SEC). The Commodores were led by head coach Gerry DiNardo in his fourth season and finished with a record of five wins and six losses (5–6 overall, 2–6 in the SEC).

Schedule

Source: 1994 Vanderbilt football schedule

References

Vanderbilt
Vanderbilt Commodores football seasons
Vanderbilt Commodores football